Felipe Andrés Reynero Galarce (born 14 March 1989) is a Chilean footballer who plays as a winger in Ñublense.

Career
He signed with Deportes Copiapó for the 2023 season of the Chilean Primera División.

Personal life
He is the son of the former professional footballer .

References

External links
 
 Felipe Reynero at Football Lineups
 

1989 births
Living people
Footballers from Santiago
Chilean footballers
Chilean expatriate footballers
San Antonio Unido footballers
Deportes Magallanes footballers
Rangers de Talca footballers
C.D. Huachipato footballers
Universidad de Concepción footballers
Deportes Iquique footballers
Atlante F.C. footballers
Curicó Unido footballers
Cobresal footballers
Ñublense footballers
Magallanes footballers
Deportes Copiapó footballers
Primera B de Chile players
Chilean Primera División players
Ascenso MX players
Chilean expatriate sportspeople in Mexico
Expatriate footballers in Mexico
Association football midfielders